Margaret C. "Margie" Morrison (19 May 19549 January 2021) was a Canadian philosopher. She worked in the philosophy of science. She was elected to the Leopoldina in 2004, the Royal Society of Canada in 2015, the Académie Internationale de Philosophie des Sciences in 2016, and received a Guggenheim Fellowship in 2017.

Education
BA, Dalhousie University 
MA, University of Western Ontario 
PhD, University of Western Ontario

Career
Morrison taught at Stanford University and the University of Minnesota. She was a professor at the University of Toronto from 1989 until her retirement in 2019.

She also held research fellowships at the Institute for Advanced Study in Berlin, the Centre for Mathematical Philosophy at the Ludwig Maximilian University of Munich, and the Centre for the Philosophy of the Natural and Social Sciences at the London School of Economics.

Publications
Community and Coexistence: Kant’s Third Analogy of Experience, (Kant-Studien, 1998)
Models and Mediators, Cambridge University Press (1999) (editor)
Unifying Scientific Theories: Physical Concepts and Mathematical Structures, (Cambridge University Press, 2000)
Reconstructing Reality: Models, Mathematics, and Simulations (Oxford University Press, 2015)

References

External links
philpapers.org

Canadian women philosophers
1954 births
2021 deaths
Dalhousie University alumni
University of Western Ontario alumni
Academic staff of the University of Toronto
Fellows of the Royal Society of Canada
Members of the German Academy of Sciences Leopoldina
20th-century Canadian philosophers
20th-century Canadian women writers